The Breach is an online, Canadian news outlet launched on 10 March 2021 to provide reader- and viewer-supported reporting, analysis, and videos on issues such as racism, economic inequality, colonialism, and climate change. Its contributors include the Indigenous writer, lawyer, and professor Pamela Palmater, journalists El Jones and Linda McQuaig, legal scholar Azeezah Kanji, and documentary filmmaker Avi Lewis.

The Breach promises to provide "adversarial", investigative journalism that exposes injustices more vigorously than corporate newspapers or the CBC, Canada's public broadcaster. "We believe journalism can be credible while still open about its commitments: to inspire action, tell stories about people remaking society, and amplify visions of a new world to win together", The Breach announced on its website.

In Parliament, Elizabeth May of the Green Party cited reporting from The Breach showing close ties between the federal government and Canada's oil and gas industry, a subject the publication pursued in later stories.

The Breach is a successor to The Dominion, an independent, non-profit publication launched in 2003.

References

Canadian news websites
Magazines established in 2021
Political magazines published in Canada
News magazines published in Canada
Online magazines published in Canada